The 2020 Sundance Film Festival took place from January 23 to February 2, 2020. The first lineup of competition films was announced on December 4, 2019. The opening night film was Miss Americana directed by Lana Wilson and produced by Morgan Neville, Caitrin Rogers, and Christine O'Malley.

Films

U.S. Dramatic Competition 
 The 40-Year-Old Version by Radha Blank
 Blast Beat by Esteban Arango
 Charm City Kings by Angel Manuel Soto
 Dinner in America by Adam Carter Rehmeier
 The Evening Hour by Braden King
 Farewell Amor by Ekwa Msangi
 Minari by Lee Isaac Chung
 Miss Juneteenth by Channing Godfrey Peoples
 Never Rarely Sometimes Always by Eliza Hittman
 Nine Days by Edson Oda
 Palm Springs by Max Barbakow
 Save Yourselves! by Alex Huston Fischer and Eleanor Wilson
 Shirley by Josephine Decker
 Sylvie's Love by Eugene Ashe
 Wander Darkly by Tara Miele
 Zola by Janicza Bravo

U.S. Documentary Competition 
 Be Water by Bao Nguyen
 Bloody Nose, Empty Pockets by Bill and Turner Ross
 Boys State by Jesse Moss and Amanda McBaine
 Coded Bias by Shalini Kantayya
 The Cost of Silence by Mark Manning
 Crip Camp by Jim LeBrecht and Nicole Newnham
 Dick Johnson Is Dead by Kirsten Johnson
 Feels Good Man by Arthur Jones
 The Fight by Eli Despres, Josh Kriegman and Elyse Steinberg
 Mucho Mucho Amor by Cristina Costantini and Kareem Tabsch
 Spaceship Earth by Matt Wolf
 A Thousand Cuts by Ramona S. Diaz
 Time by Garrett Bradley
 Us Kids by Kim A. Snyder
 Welcome to Chechnya by David France
 Whirlybird by Matt Yoka

Premieres 
 The Courier by Dominic Cooke (previously titled "Ironbark")
 Downhill by Nat Faxon and Jim Rash
 Dream Horse by Euros Lyn
 Falling by Viggo Mortensen
 The Father by Florian Zeller
 Four Good Days by Rodrigo García
 The Glorias by Julie Taymor
 Herself by Phyllida Lloyd
 Horse Girl by Jeff Baena
 Kajillionaire by Miranda July
 The Last Shift by Andrew Cohn
 The Last Thing He Wanted by Dee Rees
 Lost Girls by Liz Garbus
 The Nest by Sean Durkin
 Promising Young Woman by Emerald Fennell
 Sergio by Greg Barker
 Tesla by Michael Almereyda
 Uncle Frank by Alan Ball
 Wendy by Benh Zeitlin
 Worth by Sara Colangelo

Documentary Premieres 

 Aggie by Catherine Gund
 Assassins by Ryan White
 Disclosure: Trans Lives on Screen by Sam Feder
 The Dissident by Bryan Fogel
 Giving Voice by James D. Stern
 The Go-Go's by Alison Ellwood
 Happy Happy Joy Joy - The Ren & Stimpy Story by Ron Cicero and Kimo Easterwood
 Natalie Wood: What Remains Behind by Laurent Bouzereau
 Okavango: River of Dreams (Director's Cut) by Dereck Joubert and Beverly Joubert
 Rebuilding Paradise by Ron Howard
 Miss Americana by Lana Wilson
 On the Record by Kirby Dick and Amy Ziering
 The Social Dilemma by Jeff Orlowski
 Vivos by Ai Weiwei

World Cinema Dramatic Competition 
 Charter by Amanda Kernell
 Cuties by Maïmouna Doucouré
 Exile by Visar Morina
 High Tide by Verónica Chen
 Identifying Features by Fernanda Valadez
 Jumbo by Zoé Wittock
 Luxor by Zeina Durra
 Possessor by Brandon Cronenberg
 Summer White by Rodrigo Ruiz Patterson
 Surge by Aneil Karia
 This Is Not a Burial, It's a Resurrection by Lemohang Jeremiah Mosese
 Yalda, a Night for Forgiveness by Massoud Bakhshi

World Cinema Documentary Competition 
 Acasă, My Home by Radu Ciorniciuc
 The Earth Is Blue as an Orange by Iryna Tsilyk
 Epicentro by Hubert Sauper
 Influence by Diana Neille and Richard Poplak
 Into the Deep by Emma Sullivan
 The Mole Agent by Maite Alberdi
 Once Upon a Time in Venezuela by Anabel Rodríguez Ríos
 The Painter and the Thief by Benjamin Ree
 The Reason I Jump by Jerry Rothwell
 Saudi Runaway by Susanne Regina Meures
 Softie by Sam Soko
 The Truffle Hunters by Michael Dweck and Gregory Kershaw

NEXT 
 Beast Beast by Danny Madden
 Black Bear by Lawrence Michael Levine
 I Carry You With Me by Heidi Ewing
 The Killing of Two Lovers by Robert Machoian
 La Leyenda Negra by Patricia Vidal Delgado
 The Mountains Are a Dream That Call to Me by Cedric Cheung-Lau
 Omniboat: A Fast Boat Fantasia by The Daniels, Hannah Fidell, Alexa Lim Haas, Lucas Leyva, Olivia Lloyd, Jillian Mayer, The Meza Brothers, Terence Nance, Brett Potter, Dylan Redford, Xander Robin, Julian Yuri Rodriguez, Celia Rowlson-Hall
 Some Kind of Heaven by Lance Oppenheim
 Spree by Eugene Kotlyarenko
 Summertime by Carlos López Estrada

Midnight 
 Amulet by Romola Garai
 Bad Hair by Justin Simien
 His House by Remi Weekes
 Impetigore by Joko Anwar
 Relic by Natalie Erika James
 Run Sweetheart Run by Shana Feste
 Scare Me by Josh Ruben
 The Night House by David Bruckner
 The Nowhere Inn by Bill Benz

Spotlight 
 And Then We Danced by Levan Akin
 Collective by Alexander Nanau
 Ema by Pablo Larraín
 La Llorona by Jayro Bustamante
 The Assistant by Kitty Green
 The Climb by Michael Angelo Covino
 The Perfect Candidate by Haifaa al-Mansour

Kids 

 Binti by Frederike Migom
 Come Away by Brenda Chapman
 Timmy Failure: Mistakes Were Made by Tom McCarthy

Awards 
The following awards were given out:

Grand Jury Prizes
 U.S. Dramatic Competition – Minari (Lee Isaac Chung)
 U.S. Documentary Competition – Boys State (Jesse Moss)
 World Cinema Dramatic Competition – Yalda, a Night for Forgiveness (Massoud Bakhshi)
 World Cinema Documentary Competition – Epicentro (Hubert Sauper)

Audience Awards
 U.S. Dramatic Competition – Minari (Lee Isaac Chung)
 U.S. Documentary Competition – Crip Camp (Jim LeBrecht and Nicole Newnham)
 World Cinema Dramatic Competition – Identifying Features (Fernanda Valadez)
 World Cinema Documentary Competition – The Reason I Jump (Jerry Rothwell)
 NEXT – I Carry You With Me (Heidi Ewing)

Directing
 U.S. Dramatic Competition – Radha Blank for The 40-Year-Old Version
 U.S. Documentary Competition – Garrett Bradley for Time
 World Cinema Dramatic Competition – Maïmouna Doucouré for Cuties
 World Cinema Documentary Competition – Iryna Tsilyk for The Earth Is Blue as an Orange
 Waldo Salt Screenwriting Award – Edson Oda for Nine Days
 NEXT Innovator Prize – Heidi Ewing for I Carry You With Me

Special Jury Prizes
 U.S. Dramatic Special Jury Award for Ensemble Cast – The cast of Charm City Kings 
 U.S. Dramatic Special Jury Award: Auteur Filmmaking – Josephine Decker for Shirley
 U.S. Dramatic Special Jury Award: Neo-Realism – Eliza Hittman for Never Rarely Sometimes Always
 U.S. Documentary Special Jury Award for Editing – Tyler H. Walk for Welcome to Chechnya
 U.S. Documentary Special Jury Award for Innovation in Non-fiction Storytelling – Kirsten Johnson for Dick Johnson Is Dead
 U.S. Documentary Special Jury Award for Emerging Filmmaker – Arthur Jones for Feels Good Man
 U.S. Documentary Special Jury Award for Social Impact Filmmaking – Eli Despres, Josh Kriegman and Elyse Steinberg for The Fight
 World Cinema Dramatic Special Jury Award for Acting – Ben Whishaw for Surge
 World Cinema Dramatic Special Jury Award for Visionary Filmmaking – Lemohang Jeremiah Mosese for This Is Not a Burial, It's a Resurrection
 World Cinema Dramatic Special Jury Award for Best Screenplay – Astrid Rondero and Fernanda Valadez for Identifying Features
 World Cinema Documentary Special Jury Award for Creative Storytelling – Benjamin Ree for The Painter and the Thief
 World Cinema Documentary Special Jury Award for Cinematography – Radu Ciorniciuc and Mircea Topoleanu for Acasă, My Home
 World Cinema Documentary Special Jury Award for Editing – Mila Aung-Thwin, Ryan Mullins and Sam Soko for Softie
 Alfred P. Sloan Award – Tesla (Michael Almereyda)
 Gayle Stevens Volunteer Award – Devon Edwards

References

External links

Sundance Film Festival
Sundance Film Festival
Sundance Film Festival
2020 in American cinema
January 2020 events in the United States
February 2020 events in the United States